Forever Blues is a 2005 Italian drama film written, directed and starred by Franco Nero, at his debut as director. It is loosely based on the drama with the same name by Enrico Bernard. At the time of its release the film was openly praised by Italian first lady Franca Ciampi, wife of President of the Italian Republic Carlo Azeglio Ciampi, that defined the film as "educational, emotional, bright and poetic".

Cast 
Daniele Piamonti: Marco  
Franco Nero: Luca
Valentina Mezzacappa: Marco's lover
Robert Madison: Marco adult
Minnie Minoprio: the singer

Reception

Critical response

Forever Blues garnered a mixed to negative reception from critics. Giancarlo Zappoli, writing for Mymovies.it, gave the film a 2 out of 5 stars review. Bruno Trigo, writing for Cinema4Stelle, gave the film a 1.5 out of 4 stars review.

Award
Franco Nero received a "Special Jury Award" for Forever Blues at the 2006 Globo d'oro.

References

External links

2005 films
Italian drama films
2000s Italian films